John Jordan (born 7 February 1932) played first-class cricket for Lancashire as a lower-order batsman and wicketkeeper between 1955 and 1957. He was born at Rawtenstall, Lancashire, England.

References

1932 births
People from Rawtenstall
Living people
English cricketers
Lancashire cricketers